The Doctor in Spite of Himself is a 1999 Hong Kong film based on the play Le Médecin malgré lui by Molière.

Cast
 Cheung Tat-ming - Tin Sat, the doctor in spite of himself
 Ada Choi - Dong Kwai, his wife
 Christine Ng - Kei Chi
 Lai Yiu-Cheung - The servant
 Simon Lui - Ham Kam-kat, the suitor
 Elvis Tsui		
 Leung Wing-Chung		
 Benz Hui - The rich old man
 Mok Siu Chung - Administrator
 Gigi Fu - Administrator's sister
 Donna Chu		
 Chan Kwok-Pong

External links
 
 
 HK Cinemagic entry

Hong Kong comedy films
1999 films
Films based on works by Molière
Hong Kong films based on plays
1990s Hong Kong films